MARECS was a version of the European Space Agency's ECS communications satellite, adapted for maritime communications. It was used by Inmarsat. 

MARECS A was launched in 1981 and placed over the Atlantic Ocean. MARECS was lost due to launch problems in 1982, while MARECS B2 was launched in 1984 and placed over the Pacific Ocean. They were among Europe's first telecommunications satellites. MARECS B2 was active until 2002.

References

External links
 Documentary

Communications satellites
European Space Agency satellites